The men's 200 metres event at the 1982 Commonwealth Games was held on 5 and 7 October at the QE II Stadium in Brisbane, Australia.

Medalists

Results

Heats
Qualification: First 6 in each heat (Q) qualify for the quarterfinals.

Wind:Heat 1: ? m/s, Heat 2: -1.1 m/s, Heat 3: ? m/s, Heat 4: +0.8 m/s, Heat 5: -0.7 m/s, Heat 6: ? m/s

Quarterfinals
Qualification: First 4 in each heat (Q) and the next 2 fastest (q) qualify for the semifinals.

Wind:Heat 1: -1.3 m/s, Heat 2: -1.6 m/s, Heat 3: ? m/s, Heat 4: -2.0 m/s

Semifinals
Qualification: First 4 in each semifinal (Q) and the next 1 fastest (q) qualify for the final.

Wind:Heat 1: +2.1 m/s, Heat 2: +2.1 m/s

Final
Wind: +0.4 m/s

References

Heats & Quarterfinals results (The Sydney Morning Herald)
Semifinals & Final results (The Sydney Morning Herald)
Heats & Quarterfinals results (The Canberra Times)
Semifinals & Final results (The Canberra Times)
Australian results 

Athletics at the 1982 Commonwealth Games
1982